An International Local Story is a 2019 Indian Malayalam-language comedy film directed by Harisree Ashokan. The film is about the friendship between five friends and features Rahul Madhav, Aswin Jose,  Dharmajan Bolgatty, Bijukuttan, Deepak Parambol, Manoj K. Jayan, Mamitha Baiju and Tini Tom in substantial roles.

The music was composed by Gopi Sundar, Nadirshah and Arun Raj. Songs were written by Rajeev Alunkal, Hari Narayanan, and Dinu Mohan. The film was released on 1 March 2019.

Cast

 Rahul Madhav as Rahul
 Aswin Jose as Yadhu
 Harisree Ashokan as Ayyappan Nair
 Dharmajan Bolgatty as Kunjaro
 Tini Tom as Krishnan
 Ijaaz Ebrahim as Young Krishnan
 Manoj K. Jayan as Shivan
 Bijukuttan as Sinthappan
 Deepak Parambol as Mahesh
 Suresh Krishna as Sketch Roni Kuttan
Jubil Rajan P Dev as Mandan Gunda
 Nandu as Madhavan Nair
Shobha Mohan as Vilasini
 Surabhi Santosh as Lachu
 Mamitha Baiju as Devika
 Arjun Ashokan as Photographer (Cameo)
 John Kaippallil as Arjun
Parvathi T. as Nirmala
Kunjan as Rahul's father
 Baiju as SI Mannavendran
 Innocent as Parameshwaran Panikkar
 Salim Kumar as MLA Joseph Manavalan
 Kalabhavan Shajon as Sugunan
 Kolappulli Leela as Mannavendran's mother
 Kalabhavan Rahman
 Pauly Valsan as Kunjaro's mother
 Anjana Appukuttan
 Asha Nair as Radha
 Sasankan Mayyanad 
Mafiya Sasi as Vatti Sasi
Abu Salim as Hamsa
Jaffar Idukki as Srikandan
Manikuttan – Special appearance in song
Remya Panicker
Kalabhavan Haneef as Moideen
Eloor George as Antappan
 A. M. Ariff as himself

Production
An International Local Story was the directorial debut of actor Harisree Ashokan. It was produced by M. Shijith under the banner of S – Square Cinemas. The principal photography began on 10 September 2018 in Ernakulam. The film is a combination of suspense, comedy, drama, friendship and love.

Soundtrack
The soundtrack consists three songs composed by Arun Raj & Gopi Sunder.

Reception 

The Times of India wrote in its review "The comedy dialogues are quite tacky and unentertaining, that one can’t believe the talented team behind it, who specialise in humour, couldn’t forsee their impact on screen"

The New Indian Express reviewed that "Asokan somehow manages to keep things moving, and, if anything, he proves that he is a fairly skilled director. He has only begun, and one expects he’ll get better with his next directorial" and went on to say "Though it’s not the sort of film that sticks with you, an ample amount of fun can be had if you’ve got the patience for it."

References

External links
 

2019 films
2010s Malayalam-language films
Indian comedy films
Films shot in Kochi
2019 comedy films